Idmonea is a genus of bryozoans belonging to the family Idmoneidae.

The genus has almost cosmopolitan distribution.

Species:

Idmonea affinis 
Idmonea aldingensis 
Idmonea alfredi 
Idmonea alipes 
Idmonea alternata 
Idmonea arborea 
Idmonea arcuata 
Idmonea bacillaris 
Idmonea bairnsdalei 
Idmonea bialternata 
Idmonea bifrons 
Idmonea brutia 
Idmonea californica 
Idmonea carinata 
Idmonea complanata 
Idmonea compressa 
Idmonea concinna 
Idmonea conferta 
Idmonea conferta 
Idmonea cristata 
Idmonea delicatissima 
Idmonea denticulata 
Idmonea diligens 
Idmonea divergens 
Idmonea elongata 
Idmonea erecta 
Idmonea expansa 
Idmonea falciformis 
Idmonea fasciculata 
Idmonea fenestrata 
Idmonea flabellata 
Idmonea frondosa 
Idmonea galeotti 
Idmonea geminata 
Idmonea gracilis 
Idmonea gracilis 
Idmonea grandiora 
Idmonea granulata 
Idmonea grateloupi 
Idmonea hedenborgi 
Idmonea horrida 
Idmonea insolita 
Idmonea lata 
Idmonea macgillivrayi 
Idmonea magna 
Idmonea magnireversa 
Idmonea marionensis 
Idmonea minor 
Idmonea minor 
Idmonea morningtoniensis 
Idmonea nana 
Idmonea obliqua 
Idmonea parasitica 
Idmonea parvula 
Idmonea parvula 
Idmonea pedata 
Idmonea pseudodisticha 
Idmonea radiata 
Idmonea radiolitorum 
Idmonea rostrigera 
Idmonea rugica 
Idmonea schlumbergeri 
Idmonea seguenzai 
Idmonea semispiralis 
Idmonea simplex 
Idmonea sloani 
Idmonea snehi 
Idmonea spica 
Idmonea subcarinata 
Idmonea subdistica 
Idmonea tortuosa 
Idmonea translucens 
Idmonea triangularis 
Idmonea triquetra 
Idmonea tuberosa 
Idmonea tubulipora 
Idmonea tumida 
Idmonea uniseriata 
Idmonea venusta

References

Bryozoan genera